The silent treatment is a refusal to communicate verbally with someone who desires the communication.

Silent Treatment or The Silent Treatment may also refer to

 Silent Treatment (The Bled album), 2007
 Silent Treatment (Pati Yang album), 2005
 The Silent Treatment (Mark Deutrom album), 2001 
 Silent Treatment (Long John Baldry album), a 1986 album by Long John Baldry
 Silent Treatment (Highasakite album), 2014
 "Silent Treatment" (song), a 1980 song by Earl Thomas Conley
"Silent Treatment" (Whitney), a 2011 episode of the TV series  Whitney